Steven Legendre (born May 5, 1989) is an American gymnast who competed for the University of Oklahoma Sooners men's gymnastic team from 2008 to 2011  and is a member of the U.S. National Team.

Early years
Steven was born to Raymond and Lisa Legendre, and has 2 sisters (Jaime and Jessica) and one brother, Michael. Jessica played softball for the University of Oklahoma. He attended Earl L. Vandermeulen High School in Port Jefferson, New York, where he competed on the wrestling team, and then Spring Creek Academy in Plano, Texas, when he began training under Yuri Kartsev at the World Olympic Gymnastics Academy. On leaving high school he was recruited by the University of Minnesota, the University of Illinois and Ohio State University; he ultimately decided to attend the University of Oklahoma.

NCAA career
During his collegiate career Legendre won 12 All-America honors and 6 NCAA titles. In 2008, he became the first Sooner men's gymnast to win 2 NCAA event titles (floor and vault).  In 2009, he won the all-around as well as the floor and vault titles, the highest number of titles by a gymnast that year. In 2010, he claimed his 3rd consecutive floor title - tying him with Jonathan Horton's Oklahoma gymnastics record.  In 2011, Legendre won the Nissen Award (the "Heisman" of men's gymnastics).

International career
Legendre joined the Senior National Team in 2009 where he was chosen to compete in the 2009 World Artistic Gymnastics Championships in London, England. He made the floor final where he placed 8th. The following year he traveled to Melbourne where he was part of the gold medal team in the Pacific Rim Championships, also winning the bronze medal for the floor exercise. Later he traveled to the 2010 World Artistic Gymnastics Championships in Rotterdam where he helped the team to a 4th-place finish in the team competition and again came 8th in the floor finals. In 2011 he was part of the bronze medal winning team at the 2011 World Artistic Gymnastics Championships. He again competed in the floor final, where he managed to improve on his previous rankings at past world competitions, finishing in 5th place behind bronze medalists Alexander Shatilov and Diego Hypólito. In 2013, he competed at the 2013 World Artistic Gymnastics Championships in Antwerp, Belgium. He tied with Hypolito for 5th place once again in the floor final and earned his first individual world medal, a silver on the vault behind Yang Hak Seon and ahead of Kristian Thomas.

Personal life
On April 27, 2013, he married Alaina Williams. It was announced that he would serve as an assistant coach for the Oklahoma Sooners men's gymnastics team.

References

Living people
1989 births
American male artistic gymnasts
Medalists at the World Artistic Gymnastics Championships
Oklahoma Sooners men's gymnasts
People from Port Jefferson, New York
Gymnasts at the 2015 Pan American Games
Pan American Games gold medalists for the United States
Pan American Games medalists in gymnastics
Medalists at the 2015 Pan American Games
21st-century American people